Dear Santa is a 2005 American Christmas television film directed by Jim Hunziker and starring Clay Aiken, Hilary Duff, Raven Symoné, and Tony Hawk. The film first aired December 9, 2005 on the Fox network, and Season 2 was hosted by Kristen Bell and aired  November 28, 2006 on ABC Family.

Plot 
Santa Claus (voiced by Tom Kane) grants the wishes of children via letters from Operation Santa of the United States Postal Service, having the kids' favorite celebrities, such as Clay Aiken, Raven-Symoné, Hilary Duff, and Tony Hawk help grant the wishes. Season two was hosted by Kristen Bell star of Veronica Mars and featured Sarah Chalke, Wilmer Valderrama, Brian McKnight, Matt Dallas and the Los Angeles Galaxy.  Dear Santa was created by Darren Mann and produced by Mann Made Productions, City Explorer TV and Lions Gate Television in association with the United States Postal Service.  A Dear Santa holiday music CD was produced and sold through over 20,000 United States Post Offices. The CD featured songs performed by Nat King Cole, Nick Lachey, Alicia Keys, Andy Williams, Johnny Mathis, Roland Gift and more.

Cast 
 Clay Aiken as himself
 Hilary Duff as herself
 Tony Hawk as himself
 Al Hodek as Santa Claus 
 Tom Kane as Santa Narration
 Raven-Symoné as herself
 Brenda Song as herself

External links 
 

2005 television specials
Fox television specials
Santa Claus in television
Television series by Lionsgate Television
American Christmas television specials